The thirteenth season of Blue Bloods, a police procedural drama series created by Robin Green and Mitchell Burgess, premiered on CBS on October 7, 2022.

Cast

Main cast
Tom Selleck as New York City Police Commissioner Francis "Frank" Reagan
Donnie Wahlberg as Detective 1st Grade Daniel "Danny" Reagan
Bridget Moynahan as ADA Erin Reagan
Will Estes as Sergeant Jamison "Jamie" Reagan
Len Cariou as former NYPD Commissioner Henry Reagan
Marisa Ramirez as Detective 1st Grade Maria Baez
Vanessa Ray as Officer Edit "Eddie" Janko-Reagan

Recurring cast
Abigail Hawk as Detective 1st Grade Abigail Baker
Gregory Jbara as Deputy Commissioner of Public Information Garrett Moore
Robert Clohessy as Lieutenant Sidney "Sid" Gormley
Steve Schirripa as DA Investigator Anthony Abetemarco
Will Hochman as Detective 3rd Grade Joseph "Joe" Hill
Andrew Terraciano as Sean Reagan
Rosyln Ruff as D.A. Kimberly "Kim" Crawford
Ian Quinlan as Officer Luis Badillo
Stacy Keach as Archbishop Kevin Kearns
Peter Hermann as Jack Boyle
Stephanie Kurtzuba as Captain McNichols
Dylan Walsh as Mayor Peter Chase 
Callie Thorne as Maggie Gibson 
James Hiroyuki Liao as Lieutenant Fleming 
Steven Maier as Officer Zach "Christo" Christodoulopoulos

Guest star
 Bonnie Somerville as Paula Hill
 Lauren Patten as Rachel Witten
Lyle Lovett as Texas Ranger Waylon Gates

Episodes
<onlyinclude>

Ratings

References

External links
 
 

Blue Bloods (TV series)
2022 American television seasons